Tanzhou may refer to:

Tanzhou Town, town in and subdivision of Zhongshan, Guangdong
Changsha, formerly known as Tanzhou

Historical prefectures
Tan Prefecture (Hunan), which existed between the 6th and 14th centuries in modern Hunan
Tan Prefecture (Beijing), which existed between the 6th and 14th centuries in modern Beijing

See also
Tan (disambiguation)